Hugh Herbert John "Robbie" Robson (2 November 1918 – 17 April 1996) was a New Zealand lawn bowls player.

At the 1962 British Empire and Commonwealth Games in Perth, Western Australia, he won the men's pairs gold medal partnering Bob McDonald. Eight years later he won the silver medal again with McDonald in the pairs at the 1970 Commonwealth Games.

A member of the Tokoroa Bowling Club, Robson won the New Zealand national fours title in 1956 and the singles title in 1974.

Robson died in Hamilton on 17 April 1996.

References

External links
 

1918 births
1996 deaths
New Zealand male bowls players
Commonwealth Games gold medallists for New Zealand
Commonwealth Games silver medallists for New Zealand
Bowls players at the 1962 British Empire and Commonwealth Games
Bowls players at the 1970 British Commonwealth Games
Commonwealth Games medallists in lawn bowls
20th-century New Zealand people
Medallists at the 1962 British Empire and Commonwealth Games
Medallists at the 1970 British Commonwealth Games